Panagiotis Arnaoutoglou (born 30 May 1996) is a Greek professional footballer who plays as a left-back for Aiolikos.

References

1996 births
Living people
Greece youth international footballers
Association football defenders
Karlsruher SC II players
Apollon Smyrnis F.C. players
AEL Kalloni F.C. players
Panelefsiniakos F.C. players
AO Chania F.C. players
Greek expatriate footballers
Expatriate footballers in Germany
Footballers from Athens
Greek footballers